Bephenium hydroxynaphthoate (INN, trade names Alcopara, Alcopar, Befenium, Debefenium, Francin, Nemex) is an anthelmintic agent formerly used in the treatment of hookworm infections and ascariasis.  It is formulated as a salt between the active pharmaceutical ingredient, bephenium, and 3-hydroxy-2-naphthoic acid.

Bephenium is not FDA-approved and is not available in the United States.

References

Antiparasitic agents
Quaternary ammonium compounds
Benzyl compounds
Nicotinic agonists
Salicylates